C. A. Nicholson may refer to:
 Celia Levetus (1874-1936), Canadian-English writer using pen-name C.A. Nicholson
Sir Charles Nicholson, 2nd Baronet (1867–1949), English architect